The Großer Ölberg (also: Oelberg), at 460 metres above sea level, is the highest hill in the Siebengebirge range in Germany. It is located in the borough of Königswinter near the village of Ittenbach and south of a subpeak known as the Kleiner Ölberg.

Thanks to the transmission mast on the summit, it is visible from a long way off, for example from the A 3 motorway, and is easily distinguishable from its neighbours. At the summit is a restaurant and observation terrace that offers a very good view of the Siebengebirge as well as the High Eifel, including the Hohe Acht, as well as good views to the west.

References

External links 

 Private page with photos of the antennas on the Großer Ölberg
 Annotated panorama from the Großer Ölberg at www.panorama.photo.net

Rhein-Sieg-Kreis
Königswinter
Hills of the Siebengebirge